Teingya Minkhaung was a minister and an army general of Konbaung Dynasty of Burma (Myanmar). He is best known for his effective guerrilla warfare against the Chinese invasion forces in the Sino-Burmese War (1765–1769). It was his expedition, per the order of King Hsinbyushin, to the northern Shan States in 1764–65 to collect taxes and manpower that led to the Yunnan government to take action.

Minkhaung became famous during the third invasion by the Chinese (1767–68) in which he directed the Burmese guerrilla warfare operations against the communication and supply lines between the main Chinese army led by Gen. Mingrui and its main supply base in Hsenwi. He attained the nickname "Teingya" (lit. from the clouds) for his swift guerrilla tactics.

References

Burmese generals